Gagarinia borgmeieri is a species of beetle in the family Cerambycidae. It was described by Bondar in 1938. It is known from French Guiana and Brazil.

References

Hemilophini
Beetles described in 1938